Joseph or Joe Hurley may refer to:

People
 Joseph Hurley (art director) (1914–1982), American art director
 Joseph L. Hurley (1898–1956), American Democratic politician
 Joseph Patrick Hurley (1894–1967), American prelate of the Roman Catholic Church
 Joe Hurley, singer, songwriter and actor

Characters
 Joe Hurley, character in 5 Card Stud
 Joe Hurley, character in Flatliners

See also